Royal Bounty was launched in South Carolina in 1770, probably as George and Sarah. Her owners changed her name to Royal Bounty circa 1786. As Royal Bounty she sailed out of Leith, going on annual whale hunting voyages to the northern whale fishery (Greenland and Davis Strait). She was wrecked in 1819 on her 35th such voyage.

Career

George and Sarah
George and Sarah first appeared in Lloyd's Register (LR) in 1779.

Royal Bounty
Circa 1785 new owners renamed George and Sarah to Royal Bounty; she also underwent a thorough repair. From then on until her loss she was a whaler. Although there is no online copy of LR for 1785, there is a press report that she had returned to Leith from Greenland in August 1785 "clean", i.e., without having caught anything.

Whaling voyages
The data below for the period 1785 to 1814 comes from press mentions. The data from 1814 on comes primarily from Coltish, augmented by press reports.

		
On 13 April 1806 Royal Bounty lost her mizzen mast and several men but was able to get a new mast and proceed to the fishery.

Fate
Royal Bounty, Ritch, master, was wrecked on 16 July 1819. She was one of 10 whalers lost within a few days of each other in the Davis Strait due to gales in the ice fields. Her crew was saved. She had taken three whales before she was lost.

Citations and references
Citations

References
 
  

1770 ships
Age of Sail merchant ships of England
Whaling ships
Maritime incidents in 1819